Federico Molinari (born July 16, 1979 in La Plata) is an Argentine footballer who currently plays for Western Mass Pioneers in the USL Premier Development League.

Career

Professional
Molinari started his playing career with Gimnasia y Esgrima de La Plata in his native Argentina 1999 before moving to the United States in 2003 to play for the Pioneers.

After brief stints playing for A.S. Deliese in Italy and for the Cincinnati Kings, Molinari moved back to the Pioneers in 2006.

External links
 Pioneers bio
 Argentine Primera statistics

References

1979 births
Living people
Footballers from La Plata
Argentine sportspeople of Italian descent
Argentine footballers
Argentine expatriate footballers
Cincinnati Kings players
Club de Gimnasia y Esgrima La Plata footballers
USL Second Division players
Western Mass Pioneers players
Argentine expatriate sportspeople in the United States
USL League Two players
Association football defenders